Sulejman Spaho (born 16 June 1949) is a Serbian politician who has served as a Member of the National Assembly from 2003 to 2012 as a member of the far-right Serbian Radical Party.

Early life and political career 
Sulejman Spaho was born to a Bosnian Muslim family from Sarajevo in 1949 in Aleksinac where his father was serving in the Yugoslav People's Army. Not long after, his family moved from Aleksinac to Loznica and Spaho grew up there. Spaho's paternal grand-uncle Mehmed Spaho was a government minister in the Kingdom of Yugoslavia and the most influential Bosnian Muslim politician at that time.

He played handball for RK Metaloplastika, worked as a VK electrician in a company Viskoza, where he was fired, after which he sold paprika at the market.

Spaho joined the far-right and ultranationalist Serbian Radical Party (SRS) of Vojislav Šešelj in the early 1990s and participated in the Croatian War of Independence and the Bosnian War on the Serb side.

He became a Member of the National Assembly in 2003 as a replacement for another MP who died, and has been re-elected in the 2007 and 2008 parliamentary elections. Spaho also received 50th position on the SRS electoral list for the 2016 parliamentary elections but the list gained only 22 seats.

Spaho was photographed in August 2008 giving money to naked dancers at the Malibu nightclub in Loznica. After the photos leaked to public, Spaho has stated that the dancers were photoshopped into the photo. When the declaration on the Srebrenica Massacre was discussed, he was not present in the assembly hall, and he will be remembered for encouraging Ratko Mladić, then a fugitive, to never surrender.

Personal life and life after politics 
Spaho declares himself as an ethnic Serb and a Muslim Serb, however, although he declares himself a muslim, fellow MPs claim that he does not observe Ramadan. After finishing his MP career, Spaho has been participating in a Serbian reality show Parovi which is broadcast on Happy TV.

Currently, Spaho is a President of the non-governmental organization "Association of Serbs of the Islamic religion", which he founded with the goal of educatating as many citizens of Serbia who declare themselves as Muslim Serbs, as well as to spread historical facts about this population.

References 

1949 births
Living people
People from Aleksinac
People from Loznica
Serbian Muslims
Serbian people of Bosnia and Herzegovina descent
Serbian Radical Party politicians
Members of the National Assembly (Serbia)
Serbian nationalists